Takaaki is a masculine Japanese given name. Notable people with the name include:

Takaaki Ishibashi (石橋 貴明, born 1961) Japanese comedy artist, singer and actor
Takaaki Kajita (梶田隆章, born 1959) Japanese physicist, Nobel laureate
, Japanese ice hockey player
Katō Takaaki (加藤 高明, 1860–1926) politician, 24th Prime Minister of Japan
Takaaki Nakagami  (中上 貴晶, born 1992) Japanese motorcycle racer
Takaaki Suzuki (鈴木 孝明, born 1981) Japanese football player
Takaaki Tamura (田村 貴昭), Japanese politician
Takaaki Tokushige (徳重 隆明, born 1975) Japanese football player
Takaaki Watanabe, (渡辺 高章) pro wrestler, member of New Japan Pro Wrestling
Takaaki Yoshimoto (吉本 隆明, 1924–2012) also known as Ryūmei Yoshimoto, Japanese poet, literary critic, and philosopher

Japanese masculine given names